The Taoyuan Metro 2000 series, also referred to as Express Trains, are the electric multiple unit train types that are used for the limited-stop Express services on the Taoyuan Airport MRT.

History 

In 2006, a consortium consisting of Marubeni Corporation, Kawasaki Heavy Industries and Hitachi was awarded a contract from the Bureau of High Speed Rail (BOHSR, now part of the Railway Bureau) of the Ministry of Transportation and Communications (MOTC) of Taiwan to supply the systems and build the depots for the Taoyuan Airport MRT project. Under the contract, Marubeni was in charge of overall project coordination, signalling communications and trackwork; Kawasaki responsible for rolling stock; and Hitachi for transformers. Altogether, 68 1000 series cars and 55 2000 series cars were supplied in the initial contract.

Unlike the 1000 series that were built by the Kawasaki-Taiwan Rolling Stock Company partnership, all the 2000 series trains were completely built up by Kawasaki at its Hyogo Works in Japan.

Overview 

The 2000 series was designed with identical carbody structure and operating performance as the 1000 series and hence like the 1000 series, features an aerodynamic front made of a fiber-reinforced plastic (FRP) bonnet with an emergency detrainment door that folds outwards as a ramp, a stainless steel carbody, plug doors to reduce noise and exterior LCD displays to denote the nature of the train service and the stations served. The only significant difference in the exterior is the livery, where the trains feature a purple colour to denote its designation as an Express train instead of the blue of the Commuter 1000 series; the purple colour evokes a flying Taiwan whistling thrush, which symbolises "connecting the world".

In order to handle the continuous 4.92% gradient on the line, all bogies are motorised.

The interior of the passenger compartments of the 2000 series is configured similarly to many similar dedicated airport express trains across Asia such as the MTR Airport Express in Hong Kong, the Express Rail Link in Kuala Lumpur and the AREX in Incheon, with 2+2 forward-facing seats and dedicated luggage racks provided. While a fold-up table with a depression for a drink cup is provided at the back of the seats, consumption of food and beverages are prohibited on the Taoyuan Airport MRT. Much like the 1000 series, LED displays above train doors and triplicated vertical stanchion poles are provided. Special interior features included to accommodate airport passengers include dedicated luggage racks and LCD displays capable of displaying train route information and flight information. In addition, automated external defibrillators (AED) are also provided on board the trains.

The Taoyuan Airport MRT being the fifth dedicated airport rail link in Asia to offer in-town check-in services, which are provided at Taipei Main Station and Airport Terminal 2, the 2000 series also has a baggage container car as part of the onboard baggage handling system. Following the check-in of baggage at Taipei Main Station, baggage passes through the baggage handling system in the station before being loaded onto the baggage container car (i.e., the end car facing Taoyuan Airport and Huanbei). Once the train reaches the airport, the baggage is manually unloaded and is sent to the airport's own baggage handling system and the baggage container car will then return empty to Taipei Main Station to repeat this cycle. Such a system is identical to the K400 cars of the Hong Kong MTR Airport Express trains.

Fleet numbering 

Each car is assigned its own four-digit serial number:
 The first digit denotes the train type, in this case the 2000 series.
 The second digit denotes the car position, with DM1 being 1, M1 being 2, M2 being 3, M3 being 4 and DM2 being 5.
 The DM2 car is a baggage container car that is not for passengers.
 The other two digits are the identification number of the train the car is part of. A full-length train of four cars consists of one identification number. For example, a train of five cars would have serial numbers 2501, 2401, 2301, 2201 and 2101, respectively.

Gallery

See also 
 MTR Adtranz-CAF EMU - A similar train operated by MTR of Hong Kong for Airport Express
 AREX 1000 series - A similar train used on the AREX serving Incheon Airport
 Taoyuan Metro 1000 series - The commuter counterpart of the 2000 series

References 
This article incorporates information from the corresponding articles on the Japanese and Chinese Wikipedia's.

A Study of Rolling Stock Maintenance System Planning of TaoYuan International Airport MRT

Electric multiple units of Taiwan
Taoyuan Airport MRT
750 V DC multiple units
Kawasaki multiple units